Cruriopsis is a genus of moths of the family Noctuidae.

Species
 Cruriopsis albomaculata Kishida, 1993
 Cruriopsis funebris Moore, 1872
 Cruriopsis funebris cognata Jordan, 1912
 Cruriopsis funebris funebris Moore, 1872
 Cruriopsis funebris vithoroides Leech, 1890

References
 Kishida, Y. (1993). "The agaristine moths of south east Asia (3), Description of three new forms of Longicella, Cruriopsis and Mimeusemia (Noctuidae: Agaristinae)." Gekkan-Mushi (269): 12-13. 
 Natural History Museum Lepidoptera genus database

Agaristinae